Vinegar Lane is a development in the suburb of Grey Lynn in Auckland, New Zealand. The $250 million project was announced in 2006 under the name Soho Square Ponsonby and was meant to be a major attraction in the area with apartments, office space and retail areas. Construction started on the site of an old yeast manufacturing plant, but progress was slow and the developers had gone into receivership by the end of 2009. In May 2010 receivers signed a conditional contract with Innovus; this bid failed due diligence and Soho Square was back on the market in August 2010. In 2011 the site was purchased by Progressive Enterprises with a plan to open a supermarket, an underground carpark, and other retail shops. As of 2021 a building featuring an underground car park, retail, and office space has been completed, as have multiple residential buildings.

Planned location and features 
The project was planned for the west end of Grey Lynn, Auckland, near Western Park. It was to occupy 1.3 hectares, almost the whole block within Williamson Avenue, Pollen Street and Crummer Road.

The developer website stated that the site would contain 25,000m² of office space, 35 retail shops, 53 apartments and over 1250 undercover car parking spaces.

History of the site 
From 1910 the site had been a yeast production plant. The former Dominion Yeast Company site was sold in 2004 by New Zealand Food Industries (now part of the international AB Mauri group) and up until that stage had been producing nearly all of the compressed yeast in New Zealand. The plant has since been moved to Hamilton.

In 2006 the Marlin Group bought the place. The resulting proposal caused controversy: many in the area protested against the development. In 2008 resource consent was turned down. Protests against the development continued after construction had halted; one included a group of artists using the area as a swimming pool.

By early 2010, the development had not progressed further than the initial excavation for five floors of planned underground car park. This site remained unused for some months, and Progressive Enterprises bought it in June 2011. Construction has completed on much of the site, which includes mix of retail and residential property and a large Countdown supermarket. The new development is called Vinegar Lane, and comprises two precincts, Cider and Vinegar, which reference the former use of the site. The Cider Building houses the Countdown supermarket, office space and retail, and the Vinegar precinct is mixed commercial and residential buildings. As of October 2021, many of the buildings in the Vinegar precinct have been completed, with some under construction and several empty lots remaining.

References

External links 
 Soho Square - The company website is currently offline

History of Auckland
Waitematā Local Board Area